Otter Creek is a stream in Louisa County, Iowa, in the United States. It is a tributary of the Iowa River.

Otter Creek was so named because early settlers saw otters in the creek.

See also
List of rivers of Iowa

References

Rivers of Louisa County, Iowa
Rivers of Iowa